MyKayla Brooke Skinner Harmer (born December 9, 1996) is an American former artistic gymnast.  She was the 2020 Olympic vault silver medalist and was an alternate for the 2016 Olympic team. Skinner competed at the 2014 World Championships where she contributed to the U.S. team's gold medal, also winning an individual bronze medal on vault. She won 11 total medals at the USA National Championships during her senior career. She also competed for the University of Utah's gymnastics team and was a two-time NCAA champion.

Gymnastics career

Junior
Skinner was the junior individual all-around champion of the 2011 American Classic. She was named to the junior US national team after finishing tenth in the all-around and second on vault at the National Championships.

Senior

2012
Skinner became a member of the U.S. senior national team in 2012. She was a member of the winning U.S. squad at the City of Jesolo Trophy in March.
In June, she finished 15th all around at the U.S. Nationals and third on vault. She had hoped to make the 2012 US women's Olympic team but was not selected to compete at the Olympic Trials.

2013
Skinner competed at the Fiesta Bowl in early 2013, winning every individual event except for the floor exercise where she tied for eighth place.
At the 2013 P&G Championships she placed third on vault and floor. She finished sixth in the all-around.

2014
Skinner was a member of the winning U.S. squad at the City of Jesolo Trophy in March, where she won the gold on vault and floor exercise and placed fourth in the all-around.

In August and September, Skinner competed at the Pan American Championships in Mississauga, Canada. She helped the American team place first in the team competition. Individually, she placed first in the all-around competition with a score of 56.850. In the event finals, she placed first on vault scoring 15.037, seventh on balance beam scoring 13.475, and first on floor scoring 14.750.

Skinner was selected to compete at the 2014 World Championships in Nanning, China. She won a gold medal with the U.S. in the team competition, contributing a score of 15.775 on vault and 14.666 on the floor. In the event finals, Skinner won a bronze medal in the vault, with a score of 15.366, and placed fourth in the floor exercise final, scoring a 14.700, losing out on a second bronze medal to Aliya Mustafina who had a score of 14.733.

2015 
Skinner competed at the 2015 AT&T American Cup, held in Arlington, Texas, on March 7, 2015. She placed second to Simone Biles in that event with a score of 57.832.

On July 25, at the U.S. Classic, competing on a recently injured ankle, Skinner finished 7th in the all-around with a score of 55.500. On beam, she had a fall on her back-handspring tuck full series. She had a stable routine the rest of the way and scored a 12.800, placing 12th on the event. On floor exercise, one of her best events, she threw in her Moors (double twisting double layout) and her Silivas (double twisting double tuck), but she watered down her last two tumbling passes to protect her ankle from further injury. She fell on her double tuck and scored a low 13.500 from a 6.3 start value, placing 9th on the event. She scored a 15.100 on her Cheng vault and a 14.800 on her double-twisting Yurchenko, for an average of 14.950 and placed second. She ended on bars with a more difficult routine and scored a respectable 14.100, placing her 10th.

Skinner was named to the senior national team once again and was invited to the 2015 Worlds Selection Camp in September, followed by another camp in early October. On October 8, she was named an alternate to the USA team for the 2015 World Artistic Gymnastics Championships, and she did not compete or participate in qualifications.

2016
At the 2016 U.S. National Championships, Skinner finished 10th in the all-around and won a silver medal on vault and a bronze medal on floor exercise, earning her an invitation to the U.S. Olympic Trials.

At the Olympic Trials, Skinner finished fourth in the all-around. On July 10, Skinner was named an alternate to the 2016 Olympic team alongside Ashton Locklear and Ragan Smith.

Following the Olympic Trials, Skinner retweeted a photograph of the U.S. team with her picture edited over that of Gabby Douglas. This generated a significant amount of controversy and accusations of bad sportsmanship; many fans believed it to indicate that Skinner was bitter Douglas had been selected for the Olympic team over her, as Douglas finished seventh in the all-around to Skinner's fourth.

Collegiate 
In November 2014, Skinner signed a National Letter of Intent for the University of Utah and the Utah Red Rocks program. Utah coach Greg Marsden said that Skinner was "one of the top gymnasts in the world" with "the potential to get even better as a result of her passion for the sport. She loves to flip and twist." In April 2015, Skinner announced that she would defer enrolling at Utah by a year to concentrate on making the 2016 Olympic team.

2016–2017 
Skinner enrolled at the University of Utah in 2016 as a member of its NCAA women's gymnastics team and competed in the all-around. During her freshman season Skinner won 43 total events. She was the PAC-12 champion in the individual all-around and on vault and floor exercise. At the NCAA Championships, Skinner finished second in the individual all-around with a score of 39.6125, behind Alex McMurtry of Florida. She was a national champion on floor exercise with a 9.9625 alongside Ashleigh Gnat of LSU and was also fifth on vault and eighth on balance beam. The following day, she led Utah to fifth place in the team competition finals. She is one of the only gymnasts in NCAA history to do a Silivas, which is a Double Twisting Double Back.

2017–2018 
In the 2018 season Skinner hit all 54 of her routines without a fall.  At the PAC-12 Championships, she helped Utah finish in second place.  Individually Skinner tied for first in the all-around with Kyla Ross of UCLA and tied for first on floor exercise with Katelyn Ohashi of UCLA and Elizabeth Price of Stanford.  At the 2018 NCAA Women's Gymnastics Championship Skinner won silver in the all-around and tied for first on vault with Brenna Dowell of Oklahoma and Alex McMurtry of Florida.

2018–2019 
At the PAC-12 Championships Skinner scored her third career perfect 10 on floor exercise.  She finished second in the all-around and in the team finals and won gold on floor and vault.  During the regional finals, Skinner fell on her uneven bars routine, ending her 161 routine streak without a fall, but setting a new record.  At the NCAA Championships Skinner placed seventh in the all-around after a subpar beam routine.  She recorded the second highest vault and floor exercise scores but placed fifth due to four gymnasts tying for the title.  Utah ended up finishing fourth in their semifinal and did not advance to the finals.

Elite comeback

2019
On April 25, 2019, Skinner officially confirmed her intention to return to elite gymnastics to make a run at the 2020 Olympics.  She was invited to attend the June national team training camp, which was her first training camp since coming back to the elite level.

In July 2019, Skinner made her return to elite competition at the 2019 U.S. Classic. She performed on vault, balance beam, and floor exercise. On vault she scored a 14.900 for her Amanar, the second highest single vault score behind Simone Biles and tied with Jade Carey. On balance beam and floor exercise she placed eleventh and fourteenth respectively.

At the 2019 U.S. National Championships, Skinner competed all four events on the first day of competition and ended the night in ninth place, tied with Grace McCallum. On the second day of competition, she fell off the balance beam and placed eighth in the all-around and won bronze on vault behind Simone Biles and Jade Carey.  As a result, she was added to the national team.

In September Skinner competed at the US World Championships trials where she placed fourth in the all-around behind Simone Biles, Sunisa Lee, and Kara Eaker. The following day she competed on uneven bars and balance beam, posting the fourth highest balance beam score behind Biles, Eaker, and Morgan Hurd. Due to her performance, she was named to the team to travel to the 2019 World Championships in Stuttgart alongside Biles, Lee, Eaker, Carey, and McCallum. She was named an alternate subsequently after podium training, with the US women then qualifying in first to the team final and securing the gold medal.

2020 
In March Skinner was selected to compete at the International Gymnix meet in Montreal alongside Emily Lee, Lilly Lippeatt, and Faith Torrez.  While there she helped the USA win team gold, and individually she placed second in the all-around behind Lee.  During event finals Skinner won the vault, uneven bars, and floor exercise titles.

2021 
In January Skinner revealed on Instagram that she was hospitalized with pneumonia that resulted from COVID-19.  She had planned on competing at the 2021 Winter Cup but withdrew due to insufficient training after recovering from COVID-19.  However, in March Skinner attended at a national team camp and was named to the national team.

In May Skinner competed at the U.S. Classic where she finished tenth in the all-around and finished first on vault.  Skinner was one of five gymnasts featured on the Peacock docuseries Golden: The Journey of USA's Elite Gymnasts.

At the National Championships Skinner competed the all-around both days and finished in ninth place after falling off the balance beam and going out of bounds on floor exercise on the first night.  She won silver on vault behind Simone Biles and placed ninth on uneven bars, tenth on floor exercise, and sixteenth on balance beam.  As a result she was added to the national team and qualified to compete at the Olympic Trials.

At the Olympic Trials, Skinner finished fifth in the all-around and was selected to represent the United States in the non-nominative spot at the Tokyo Olympics, meaning she would compete as an individual instead of on the four-member USA team. At the time, this was a controversial decision, as the USA's other individual spot had already been awarded nominatively to Jade Carey, whose strengths on vault and floor exercise matched those of Skinner. Because Biles was predicted to qualify ahead of any other gymnast for both the vault and the floor exercise final, the two-per-country limitation meant that only one of Skinner or Carey could qualify for each final.

On July 3 Skinner announced that she would retire from competitive gymnastics after the Olympics; she will return to the University of Utah to complete her degree but will not compete on their gymnastics team for her senior season.  She also announced that she would be joining Simone Biles' Gold Over America Tour.

At the Olympic Games Skinner performed the all-around during qualifications, hitting all four of her routines. Despite finishing in eleventh place in the all-around and fourth place on the vault, she did not qualify to either final due to two-per-country limitations.  Americans Simone Biles, Sunisa Lee, and Jade Carey finished ahead of her in the all-around, and Biles and Carey did so again on vault.

Skinner took Biles' place in the vault final when Biles dropped out. Skinner finished second, winning the silver medal with an average score for her Cheng and Amanar vaults of 14.916. Afterward, she said, "After having COVID, I seriously didn't know I would be able to go back into the gym, so just being able to overcome that and to keep pushing for my goals and dreams to make it to the Olympics has been such an honor. And now to even be go in for [the] vault [final] and to win a silver medal, that's icing on the cake for me."

Personal life
MyKayla Skinner was born on December 9, 1996, in Gilbert, Arizona to Cris and Kym Skinner. She has three older siblings, Jeremy, Chelsea, and Katie, two of whom are former gymnasts themselves. Skinner is a member of the Church of Jesus Christ of Latter-day Saints. She grew up in Gilbert, Arizona, and said that her role model was Olympic gold medalist Shawn Johnson.

Skinner trained with the coaches of Desert Lights Gymnastics in Chandler, Arizona. Her personal coach was the head coach of the club, Lisa Spini. She attended Higley High School in 2011 as a freshman and was home schooled starting in 2012.<ref
name=officialwebsite_mykaylaskinner_about />

On October 16, 2019, Skinner announced on Instagram that she was engaged to Jonas Harmer, whom she met while studying at the University of Utah. Skinner and Harmer were married on November 14, 2019.

Competitive history

Career perfect 10.0

References

External links
 
 

1996 births
Living people
American female artistic gymnasts
American Latter Day Saints
Gymnasts at the 2020 Summer Olympics
Medalists at the 2020 Summer Olympics
Medalists at the World Artistic Gymnastics Championships
Olympic gymnasts of the United States
Olympic silver medalists for the United States in gymnastics
People from Gilbert, Arizona
Sportspeople from the Phoenix metropolitan area
Utah Red Rocks gymnasts
NCAA gymnasts who have scored a perfect 10
U.S. women's national team gymnasts